If the World Was You is an album by J.D. Souther, released in 2008. It was his first studio release in 24 years, recorded live with a five piece jazz ensemble.

Track listing 
All the song written by J.D. Souther.
 "I'll Be Here at Closing Time" – 3:38
 "House of Pride" – 3:16
 "Journey Down the Nile" – 4:46
 "One More Night (Killing Spree)" – 4:18
 "In My Arms Tonight" – 4:22
 "Rain" – 5:03
 "A Chorus of Your Own" – 6:19
 "The Border Guard" – 4:26
 "Brown (Osaka Story)" – 5:49
 "Come On Up" – 4:20
 "The Secret Handshake of Fate" – 12:56
"On The Day Nobody Likes You" - 5:55 (bonus track for Japan -- appears as track 11, preceding "The Secret Handshake of Fate")

Personnel
John David Souther – vocals, guitar, sax
Béla Fleck – banjo
Jeff Coffin – flute, saxophone
Marie Vanel Borderon Choir – chorus
Sylvia Elana Garcia Choir – chorus, soloist  
Dan Immel – bass  
Marisol LaBoy Choir – chorus  
Jim Mayer – bass  
Rod McGaha – trumpet  
Chris Walters – piano  
Jim White – drums, percussion
Production notes
John David Souther – producer
Jim White – digital editing
Erick Anderson – portraits
Richie Biggs – digital editing, mixing
Niko Bolas – engineer, mixing
Ernest Chapman – photography
Jim McGuire – photography, cover portrait
John Netti – engineer
Mark Petaccia – engineer
David Robinson – engineer
Ron Stone – management
Edward O'Day – management
Richard Dodd – mastering
Cheryl Gibson – photography
Jordan Brooke Hamlin – layout design, packaging, cover graphics

References

External links 
 Official Website
 Official Myspace page with clips from the new album

2008 albums
J. D. Souther albums